The common triplefin, Forsterygion lapillum, is a fish of the genus Forsterygion, found around the coast of New Zealand  down to depths of about 15 m. Its length is between 4 and 8 cm. It is commonly found in intertidal rock pools. It can also be found in water as deep as 30m, feeding primarily on crustaceans and polychaetes.

References

 
 Tony Ayling & Geoffrey Cox, Collins Guide to the Sea Fishes of New Zealand,  (William Collins Publishers Ltd, Auckland, New Zealand 1982) 

Common triplefin
Endemic marine fish of New Zealand
Fish described in 1989